Jimmy Dorrell is Executive Director of Mission Waco in Waco, TX and pastor of Church Under the Bridge. Dorrell is also a part-time professor at Baylor University and George W. Truett Theological Seminary and has authored three books.

Early life and education
He grew up in Conroe, TX and moved to Waco in 1968 to attend Baylor University where he majored in religion and received a BA in 1972. He graduated from Southwestern Baptist Theological Seminary with an M.Div. in 1978 and received his MA in Environmental Studies from Baylor in 1993. In 2001 he received his Doctor of Ministry (D.Min.) degree from Eastern Baptist Theological Seminary in Philadelphia.

Ministry
Dorrell is pastor of Church Under the Bridge and teaches classes at Baylor University and George W. Truett Theological Seminary in Waco. He has served on many boards including Teen Pregnancy Prevention Council, Parents as Teachers, Compassion Ministries of Waco, Waco Tribune Herald Board of Contributors, Census 2000 Special Housing Subcommittee Chair, Christian Community Development Association, and currently the Texas Christian Community Development Network. He has been honored through awards such as Family of the Year Award-Waco Conference of Christians & Jews, Hometown Hero Award, Citizen of the Year-National Association of Social Workers Waco Unit and Baylor University Alumni’s Abner V. McCall Humanitarian Award, Wacoan of the Year (2016), and Baylor University Distinguished Alumni (2016).

After receiving his degree from seminary in 1978, he and his wife Janet moved into the North Waco neighborhood where they began their call to incarnational ministry, to live among the poor and help bring “good news” through relationships and empowerment opportunities. His passion for the poor and mobilizing the middle-class to become involved in the lives of the poor became the strategy for Mission Waco that continues today. Jimmy Dorrell and his wife Janet Dorrell founded Mission Waco Mission World which includes empowerment and community development work in Waco, Mexico, India and Haiti. Dorrell also serves at President of the Texas Christian Community Development Network.

Bibliography
 Trolls and Truth: 14 Realities About Today's Church That We Don't Want to See  (New Hope, 2006)
 Plunge2Poverty: An Intensive Poverty Simulation Experience (New Hope, 2007)
 Dead Church Walking: Giving Life to the Church That is Dying to Survive (Biblica, 2011)

External links
 Mission Waco's Official Web Site
 Church Under the Bridge's Official Web Site
 Faculty Bio at George W. Truett Theological Seminary
<www.txccdn.net>

Living people
Southwestern Baptist Theological Seminary alumni
Palmer Theological Seminary alumni
American Christian clergy
People from Waco, Texas
Baylor University faculty
Year of birth missing (living people)